The 19th British Academy Film Awards, given by the British Academy of Film and Television Arts in 1966, honoured the best films of 1965.

Winners and nominees

 Source:

Statistics

References

Film019
British Academy
1966 in British cinema